Kalle Kalima (born 29 December 1973 in Helsinki, Finland) is a Finnish jazz guitarist and improvisational musician.

Biography 
Kalima got piano lessons as a child for five years before switching to the guitar at age 11. He studied at the Sibelius Academy in Helsinki with Raoul Björkenheim and at the Hochschule für Musik "Hanns Eisler" in Berlin with John Schröder. He then worked with such musicians as trumpeter Tomasz Stańko, saxophonist Juhani Aaltonen, pianist Heikki Sarmanto, bassist Sirone, Teppo Hauta-Aho, Carlos Bica and Ed Schuller, guitarist Marc Ducret, composer Simon Stockhausen, singer Linda Sharrock and the Finnish musician Jimi Tenor.

Musical projects 
Kalima leads several of his own bands like the trio Klima Kalima (with bassist Oliver Potratz and drummer Oliver Steidle) is rooted in modern jazz and has recorded three albums, mostly with compositions by Kalima. The band received the 2008 New Mannheim Jazz Prize in Mannheim.

Momentum Impakto (with saxophonist Daniel Erdmann and John Schröder as drummer) was written around 1998 in Berlin. The group occurs mostly in Germany and has recorded two albums. With the Soi Ensemble (with Riikka Lampinen, cello, Mikko Helevä, organ, Mongo Aaltonen, drums) Kalima performs songs that he composed after texts by Essi Kalima. The singers included Johanna Iivanainen, Eeppi Ursin and Merzi Rajala. The debut album of the group was released in 2003.

The trio Jazz Parasites led by Kalima, comprises the bassist Ed Schuller and the drummer Ernst Bier in addition to Kalima. His latest band (2018) is K 18, a group that plays free improvisational music with acoustic and electric instruments.

Discography

Solo albums 
 2000: Hippycone (Abovoice), with Kalle Kalima Trio (Lasse Lindgren, Mika Kallio) feat. Marc Ducret
 2004: Kalle Kalima; Helsinki on My Mind (Village),feat. Oliver Potratz and Olli Steidle
 2007: Chasing Yellow (Enja), feat. Oliver Potratz and Olli Steidle
 2009: Iris in Trance (La Lune), with Kalle Kalima Pentasonic (solo)
 2010: Loru (Enja), feat. Oliver Potratz and Olli Steidle
 2013: Finn Noir (Enja/Yellowbird), feat. Oliver Potratz and Olli Steidle
 2016: High Noon (ACT), feat. Greg Cohen and Max Andrzejewski
 2019: Flying Like Eagles (ACT), feat. Knut Reiersrud, Phil Donkin and Jim Black

Collaborations 
 With Monumentum Impakto (Daniel Erdmann, John Schröder)
 1999: Haw Haw (Jazz4Ever Records)
 2004: Hyvä Bändi Livenä (Konnex Records)

 With Nuijamiehet (Lasse Lindgrén, Mika Kallio, Mikko Innanen)
 2000: Nuijamiehet (Fiasko Records)

 With Soi (Riikka Lampinen, Mikko Helevä, Mongo Aaltonen)
 2002: Pehmeä (Impala)
 2006: Koiperhonen (Texicalli Records)

 With Johnny La Marama (Chris Dahlgren, Eric Schaefer)
 2003: Johnny La Marama (meta records)
 2006: ...Fire! (Traumton Records)
 2009: Bicycle Revolution (Traumton Records)
 2014: Il Purgatorio (Traumton Records)

 With Jazz Parasites
 2004: Very Early (Phonector)

 With Bica, Klammer, Kalima
 2004: A Chama do Sol (Nabel)

 With UNKL (Gary Hoopengardner, Josh Yellon, Sebastian Merk)
 2005: UNKL (Konnex Records)

 With Baby Bonk
 2005: Sagt Die Wahrheit (Konnex Records)
 2008: Mama (NRW Records)

 with Sonar Kollektiv Orchester
 2008: Guaranteed Niceness (Sonar Kollektiv)

 With Kalle Kalima & K-18 (Mikko Innanen, Teppo Hauta-aho, Veli Kujala)
 2009: Some Kubricks of Blood (TUM Records)
 2012: Out To Lynch (TUM Records)
 2014: Buñel De Jour (TUM Records)

 With Kari Heinilä
 2010: Stilleben (Abovoice)

 With Kuu! (Christian Lillinger, Frank Möbus)
 2013: Sex Gegen Essen (Shoebill Music)

 With TUMO
 2013: And It Happened... (TUM Records), feat. Henrik Otto Donner
 2013: Occupy The World (TUM Records), feat. Wadada Leo Smith

 With Tenors of Kalma (Jimi Tenor, Joonas Riipa)
 2015: Electric Willow (Yellowbird)

 With Z-Country Paradise (Christian Marien, Frank Gratkowski, Oliver Potratz, Yelena Kuljic)
 2015: Z-Country Paradise (Z-Paradise Records)
 2018: Live in Lisbon (Leo Records)

 With Matthias Bröde's Oh!KesterOsloer3 (John Schröder, trio)
 2017: Where Is Wedding? (Unit Records)

 With Oliwood (Frank Gratkowski, Oliver Steidle)
 2017: Euphoria (Yellowbird)

References

External links 
 
 Kalle Kalima (in Interview with Alex Schmitz)
 
 Deimel Severus / Kalle Kalima

Finnish bandleaders
1973 births
Finnish jazz guitarists
Musicians from Berlin
Finnish male musicians
Finnish expatriates in Germany
Living people
21st-century guitarists
21st-century German male musicians
Male jazz musicians
ACT Music artists